Susan Hilary Spurling CBE FRSL ( Forrest; born 25 December 1940) is a British writer, known for her work as a journalist and biographer.

Early life and education
Born at Stockport, Cheshire, to circuit judge Gilbert Alexander Forrest (1912–1977) and teacher Emily Maureen, daughter of Joseph Armstrong, of Fivemiletown, County Tyrone, Spurling was educated at Clifton High School, an independent school in Bristol in South West England, followed by Somerville College, Oxford.

Career
Spurling won the Whitbread Prize for the second volume of her biography of Henri Matisse in January 2006. Burying The Bones: Pearl Buck in China was published in March 2010.

Personal life
In 1961, she married playwright John Spurling. The couple have three children (Amy, Nathaniel and Gilbert) and six grandchildren.

Works
Ivy When Young: The Early Life of Ivy Compton-Burnett 1884–1919 (1974)
Mervyn Peake: Drawings (1974)  editor
Invitation to the Dance, A Handbook to Anthony Powell's A Dance to the Music of Time (1977) 
Secrets of a Woman's Heart: The Later Life of Ivy Compton-Burnett 1920–1969 (1984)
Elinor Fettiplace's Receipt Book: Elizabethan Country House Cooking (1986)
Paul Scott: A Life (1990)
Paper Spirits. Collage Portraits by Vladimir Sulyagin (1992) introduction
Ivy: The Life of I. Compton-Burnett (1995; combines two volumes originally published separately in 1974 and 1984)
The Unknown Matisse: Volume 1 – A Life of Henri Matisse 1869–1908 (1998)
La Grande Thérèse: The Greatest Swindle of the Century (1999) on Thérèse Humbert
The Girl from the Fiction Department: A Portrait of Sonia Orwell (2002) 
Matisse the Master: The Conquest of Colour 1909–1954  (2005)
Ann Stokes: Artists' Potter (contributor) (2009)
Matisse: The Life (abridged version of two earlier works) (2009)
Pearl Buck in China (also published as Burying the Bones: Pearl Buck) (2010)
Anthony Powell: Dancing to the Music of Time

Awards
 1976,  Rose Mary Crawshay Prize for Ivy When Young: The Early Life of Ivy Compton-Burnett 1884–1919
 1984, Duff Cooper Prize for Ivy When Young: The Early Life of Ivy Compton-Burnett 1884–1919
 2005, Whitbread Book of the Year award for Matisse the Master: The Conquest of Colour 1909–1954
 2010,  James Tait Black Memorial Prize for biography, for Burying the Bones: Pearl Buck in China

References

External links
British Council page

1940 births
Living people
Alumni of Somerville College, Oxford
British biographers
British journalists
Commanders of the Order of the British Empire
Costa Book Award-winning works
Fellows of the Royal Society of Literature
James Tait Black Memorial Prize recipients
People educated at Clifton High School, Bristol
Rose Mary Crawshay Prize winners
Fellows of Somerville College, Oxford